John Quayle-Dickson (10 or 20 November 1860 – January 1945) was a British military officer and Colonial Service administrator.

After having served as an Intelligence Officer during the Second Boer War, he then assumed a number of important roles in the field of Native Affairs in South Africa. He was then the Resident Commissioner of the Gilbert and Ellice Islands on Ocean Island from 1909 to 1913, when he was removed and demoted to Colonial Secretary of the Falkland Islands. After being dismissed again from the Falklands, he became sub-commandant of the Great War POW & Aliens Detention Camp in the Isle of Man.

He was the son of Major General Edward John Dickson of The Green, Castletown, Isle of Man and his wife Lucy Mwlrea, née Quayle.

References

1860 births
1945 deaths
Colonial Administrative Service officers
Governors of the Gilbert and Ellice Islands
Manx people
British military personnel of the Second Boer War
Companions of the Distinguished Service Order